The 2017 European League of Legends Championship Series (2017 EU LCS) was the fifth season of the European League of Legends Championship Series (EU LCS), the highest level of professional League of Legends play in Europe. Most games were being played at Studio K/L in Adlershof, Berlin, Germany. The finals were held at the Barclaycard Arena in Hamburg, Germany.

The Spring Split was won by G2 Esports, with a roster of Expect, Trick, PerkZ, Zven, and Mithy and was their third EU LCS Champions title.

Spring

Regular season
Group A

Group B

Playoffs

Summer

Regular season
Group A

Group B

Playoffs

References

2017 in Berlin
2017 in German sport
2017 in Polish sport
2017 multiplayer online battle arena tournaments
European League of Legends Championship Series seasons